DEPBT (3-(diethoxyphosphoryloxy)-1,2,3-benzotriazin-4(3H)-one) is a peptide coupling reagent used in peptide synthesis. It shows remarkable resistance to racemization.

Fmoc-Dab(Mtt)-OH, a commercially available amino acid building block for solid-phase peptide synthesis (SPPS), was proven to undergo rapid lactamization, instead of reacting with the N-terminal end of the peptide. Compared with other commercially available coupling reagents, DEPBT has shown superior performance in coupling Fmoc-Dab(Mtt)-OH to the N-terminal end of peptide during SPPS, though the approach was regarded as 'costly and tedious'.

See also
 BOP
 PyBOP

References

Peptide coupling reagents
Biochemistry
Biochemistry methods
Reagents for biochemistry
Organophosphates